Cyrus Homi Chothia (19 February 1942 – 26 November 2019)  was an English biochemist who was an emeritus scientist at the Medical Research Council (MRC) Laboratory of Molecular Biology (LMB) at the University of Cambridge and emeritus fellow of Wolfson College, Cambridge.

Education
Chothia was educated at Alleyn's School, then went to study at Durham University graduating with a Bachelor of Science degree in 1965.

Research and career
After his PhD Chothia worked in the Laboratory of Molecular Biology (LMB) for three years. He then worked with Michael Levitt at the Weizmann Institute of Science followed by two years with Joel Janin at the Institut Pasteur in Paris.

In 1976 Chothia returned to England to work at University College London and the LMB. With Arthur Lesk he showed that proteins adapt to mutations by changes in structure.

In 1992 he proposed that most proteins are built of domains that come from a small number of families. He collaborated with Alexey Murzin, Steven Brenner and Tim Hubbard to create the Structural Classification of Proteins database (SCOP), a periodic table for all known protein structures. With Julian Gough he created the Superfamily database which uses Hidden Markov models to identify protein sequences that are related to those of known structures.

During his career, Chothia supervised 19 successful PhD students to completion including Alex Bateman, Steven E. Brenner, Mark Bender Gerstein, Julian Gough, Sarah Teichmann, Bissan Al-Lazikani, Goga Apic, Samantha Barré Matthew Bashton, Dan Bolser, Michael Bremang, Bernard de Bono, Emma Ganley (née Hill), Martin Madera, Siarhei Maslau, Susan Miller, Jong Park (aka Jong Bhak), Rajkumar Sasidharan, and Christine Vogel.

Awards and honours
Chothia was elected a Fellow of the Royal Society (FRS) in 2000. His certificate of election and candidature reads: 

In 2015, Chothia was elected a Fellow of the International Society for Computational Biology (ISCB) and was awarded the ISCB Accomplishment by a Senior Scientist Award in honour of his work in using computational methods to understand protein structure.

Alongside David Haussler and Michael Waterman, Chothia was awarded the 2015 Dan David Prize for his contributions to the field of bioinformatics.

References

British bioinformaticians
Fellows of the Royal Society
Fellows of Wolfson College, Cambridge
Place of birth missing
Alumni of University College London
Academics of University College London
People educated at Alleyn's School
1942 births
2019 deaths
Fellows of the International Society for Computational Biology
Alumni of University College, Durham
Academic staff of Weizmann Institute of Science
Pasteur Institute
British people of Parsi descent